Ouezzane Airport  is an airport serving Ouezzane, Morocco.

There is rising terrain southeast and southwest of the airport.

See also

Transport in Morocco
List of airports in Morocco
Talk:Ouezzane Airport

References

External links
 OpenStreetMap - Ouezzane Airport
 OurAirports - Ouezzane Airport
  Great Circle Mapper - Ouezzane
 
 Google Earth

Airports in Morocco